Cavero is a surname of Spanish origin.

People with this surname include:

Arturo "Zambo" Cavero (1940–2009), an Afro-Peruvian singer and politician
Íñigo Cavero (1929–2002), a Spanish aristocrat
José Cavero (born 1940), a Peruvian hurdler
Hardy Cavero (born 1996), a Chilean footballer

See also
José Ignacio de Cavero y Cárdenas (1757–1834), a Mexican-Colombian lawyer and politician

References

Surnames of Spanish origin